Duma (also spelled as Douma) is Palestinian town in the Nablus Governorate in the northern West Bank, located 25 kilometers southeast of Nablus. According to the Palestinian Central Bureau of Statistics, the town had a population of 2,220 inhabitants in mid-year 2006. Duma's total land area consists of 17,351 dunams, about 200 of which are designated as built-up area.

The Duma arson attack in 2015, perpetrated  by Israeli settlers, resulted in the death of an 18 months old child and both his parents in the village.

Location
Duma is located 20.3 km southeast of Nablus. It is bordered by Al Jiftlik and Fasayil to the east, Majdal Bani Fadil to the north, Qusra and Jalud to the west, and Al Mughayyir to the south.

History
Pottery sherds from the  Hellenistic,  Hellenistic/Roman and Roman era have been found here.

It has been suggested that Duma was the Biblical city of Arumah (Judges 9:41) and the place called Edumia in the Onomasticon.

South–southwest of the village is a spring called Ayn Duma, where water has been collected in ancient small pools, some hollowed out of rock.

Ottoman era
Duma, like the rest of Palestine, was incorporated into the Ottoman Empire in 1517, and in the census of 1596 the village appeared under the name Duma as being in the Nahiya (Subdistrict) of Jabal Qubal of the Liwa (District) of Nablus. It had a population of 23 households, all Muslim. They paid a fixed tax-rate of 33.3% on agricultural products, including  wheat, barley, summer crops, olive trees, goats and bee-hives; in addition to occasional revenues; a total of 1,300 akçe.

In 1838 Edward Robinson noted  Daumeh located in El-Beitawy district, east of Nablus.

In 1870, Victor Guérin visited and noted: "The village was formerly defended by two towers, one on the east and the other on the west. One of them was 18 paces long by 13 broad, and the other was 17 paces long by 8 in breadth. Some of the lower courses are still in place, and show that the towers were built of stones of large dimensions, some cut smooth and others in boss. These remains, separated by a space of about 750 yards, prove ancient work. The antiquity of the site is also proved by the numerous excavations in the rock, such as cisterns and subterranean magazines, found everywhere." Guérin further noted that the village had 300 inhabitants.

In 1882, the PEF's Survey of Western Palestine (SWP) described it as "A small village on the top of a ridge. It has cisterns and ancient rock-cut tombs. There is a spring, 'Ain Umm 'Omeir, 3/4 mile southeast of the houses. On the north is the ruin of a place sacred to el Khudr, St. George. There are olives to the north." The SWP also thought that the mosque of the village, with drafted stones, was a former church of St. George.

British Mandate era
In the 1922 census of Palestine conducted by the British Mandate authorities, Duma had a population of 155 inhabitants, all Muslims, increasing in the 1931 census to 218, still all Muslims, in a total of 43 houses.

In the 1945 statistics, Duma had a population of 310 Muslims, with 17,351 dunams of land, according to an official land and population survey. Of this, 580 dunams were plantations and irrigable land, 4,076 used for cereals, while 33 dunams were built-up (urban) land.

Jordanian era
In the wake of the 1948 Arab–Israeli War, and after the 1949 Armistice Agreements, Duma came under Jordanian rule. 

The Jordanian census of 1961 found 444 inhabitants.

1967-present

Since the Six-Day War in 1967,  Duma has been under Israeli occupation. Prior to 1967, nearly all of Duma's working male residents were farmers. Since then the number of farmers has been reduced since many residents have found work in construction in Israel or work in small businesses in the town. However, Duma's residents still mostly rely on irrigated crops, fruit orchards, olive groves and livestock for food. Water is provided to Duma by four springs: Fasayel to the west, Ein Duma and Rashash to the south and Umm Amir to the east. Fasayel, the largest spring, is also used by Israeli authorities to distribute water to nearby Israeli settlements.

Duma has three schools for girls and boys and the town established a Mayo Clinic in 2002 with the help of the Palestinian Ministry of Health.

After the 1995 accords, 5% of Duma land was classified as Area B, the remaining 95% as Area C.

On 31 July 2015, suspected Israeli settlers firebombed two homes in Duma, killing 18-month-old Ali Saad Dawabsha and critically injuring his parents and 4-year-old brother. The boy, Ali, died in the attack; his father, 32, died later of second-degree burns over most of his body, followed by the death of his wife, from her injuries, about 5 weeks later. The attack is believed to be a price tag attack by Israeli settlers, who were seen fleeing towards Ma'ale Efrayim. The attack was condemned as an act of terrorism by the Palestinian government and Israel.

In September 2017, the Israeli forces notified the residents of a housing complex near Duma that their sole water pipeline was slated for removal, on the grounds that the pipeline is “illegal.”

References

Bibliography

External links
  Welcome To Duma
Duma, Welcome to Palestine
Map of the town, Google Maps
mapcarta
Survey of Western Palestine, Map 15:    IAA,  Wikimedia commons  
Duma Village Profile,  Applied Research Institute–Jerusalem (ARIJ)
 Duma, aerial photo, ARIJ
 Development Priorities and Needs in Duma, ARIJ

Villages in the West Bank
Municipalities of the State of Palestine